Elections were held in Hastings County, Ontario, Canada, on October 27, 2014, in conjunction with municipal elections across the province.

Hastings County Council
Hastings County Council consists of the mayors and reeves of the 14 constituent municipalities.

Bancroft

Carlow/Mayo

Centre Hastings

Deseronto

Faraday

Hastings Highlands

Limerick

Madoc

Marmora and Lake

Stirling-Rawdon

Tudor and Cashel

Tweed

Tyendinaga

Wollaston

References
 
AMO - 2014 Municipal Election Results

Hastings
Hastings County